Greenfield-Central High School is a secondary school (grades 9-12) located in the city of Greenfield, Indiana. Under the management of the Greenfield-Central Community School Corporation. It had 1,363 students in 2009–2010.

The high school has television studio facilities and operates broadcast radio station WRGF. The public-access television cable TV is named GCTV.

History
In 2018 the district added a resource officer position that was full time to the high school.

Athletics
Greenfield-Central High School is part of the Hoosier Heritage Conference. The school offers soccer, tennis, cross country, football, golf, volleyball, basketball, cheerleading, swimming, wrestling, baseball, softball, dance team, and track and field.
Greenfield-Central holds one state title in football (1973). The school gained a state title in cheerleading. Two individual titles were won for wrestling (1979 Terry Edon, 2013 Joshua Farrell) and one was won for swimming (2017 Zach Cook 100 Butterfly).

Music Programs 
Greenfield-Central High School has enjoyed success with its marching band program, the Greenfield-Central Cougar Pride. In Indiana State School Music Association (ISSMA) Marching Band Class B competition, the Cougar Pride placed eighth in 2005, ninth in 2014, and as state runner-up in 2016 and 2018.  In November 2019, the Cougar Pride won the ISSMA Class B Indiana State Marching Band Championship at Lucas Oil Stadium in Indianapolis. After ISSMA competition was suspended for the 2020 season due to the worldwide COVID-19 pandemic, the Cougar Pride successfully defended their title by again winning the ISSMA Class B Indiana State Marching Band Championship on November 6, 2021 at Lucas Oil Stadium.

Notable alumni
 Mike Edwards (Class of 1969) – 1972 co-Southeastern Conference Men's Basketball Player of the Year
 Kyle Gibson (Class of 2006) – Baseball player (pitcher/infielder) at Greenfield-Central High School and pitcher at University of Missouri, starting pitcher for Minnesota Twins, first-round pick (22nd overall) in 2009 MLB Amateur Draft

See also
 List of high schools in Indiana

References

External links
 Welcome to Greenfield-Central High School — official site

Schools in Hancock County, Indiana
Public high schools in Indiana
1969 establishments in Indiana
Educational institutions established in 1969